Another Sky may refer to:

 Another Sky (album), a 2000 album by Altan
 Another Sky (band), English post-rock band formed in 2017